Choristoneura is a genus of moths in the family Tortricidae. Several species are serious pests of conifers, such as spruce and are known as spruce budworms.

Species

Choristoneura adumbratanus (Walsingham, 1900)
Choristoneura africana Razowski, 2002
Choristoneura albaniana (Walker, 1863)
Choristoneura argentifasciata Heppner, 1989
Choristoneura biennis Freeman, 1967
Choristoneura bracatana (Rebel, in Rebel & Rogenhofer, 1894)
Choristoneura carnana (Barnes & Busck, 1920)
Choristoneura chapana Razowski, 2008
Choristoneura colyma Razowski, 2006
Choristoneura conflictana (Walker, 1863)
Choristoneura diversana (Hubner, [1814-1817])
Choristoneura evanidana (Kennel, 1901)
Choristoneura expansiva X.P.Wang & G.J.Yang, 2008
Choristoneura ferrugininotata Obraztsov, 1968
Choristoneura fractivittana (Clemens, 1865) 
Choristoneura freemani Razowski, 2008, western spruce budworm
Choristoneura fumiferana (Clemens, 1865), eastern spruce budworm
Choristoneura griseicoma (Meyrick, 1924)
Choristoneura hebenstreitella (Muller, 1764), mountain-ash tortricid
Choristoneura heliaspis (Meyrick, 1909)
Choristoneura improvisana (Kuznetsov, 1973)
Choristoneura irina Syachina & Budashkin, 2007
Choristoneura jecorana (Kennel, 1899)
Choristoneura jezoensis Yasuda & Suzuki, 1987
Choristoneura lafauryana (Ragonot, 1875)
Choristoneura lambertiana (Busck, 1915)
Choristoneura longicellanus (Walsingham, 1900)
Choristoneura luticostana (Christoph, 1888)
Choristoneura metasequoiacola Liu, 1983
Choristoneura murinana (Hubner, [1796-1799])
Choristoneura neurophaea (Meyrick, 1932)
Choristoneura obsoletana (Walker, 1863)
Choristoneura occidentalis (Walsingham, 1891)
Choristoneura orae Freeman, 1967
Choristoneura palladinoi Razowski & Trematerra, 2010
Choristoneura parallela (Robinson, 1869)
Choristoneura pinus Freeman, 1953, jack pine budworm
Choristoneura propensa Razowski, 1992
Choristoneura psoricodes (Meyrick, 1911)
Choristoneura quadratica Diakonoff, 1955
Choristoneura retiniana (Walsingham, 1879)
Choristoneura rosaceana (Harris, 1841)
Choristoneura simonyi (Rebel, 1892)
Choristoneura spaldingana Obraztsov, 1962
Choristoneura thyrsifera Razowski, 1984
Choristoneura zapulata (Robinson, 1869)

References

Bibliography 
 , 2005: World Catalogue of Insects volume 5 Tortricidae.
 

 , 1965: A revision of the genus Archips from Japan. Tyô to Ga 16 (1/2): 13-40. Abstract and Full article: .

 , 1859, Wien. ent. Monatschr. 3: 426.
 , 1983: A new species of Choristoneura injurious to Metasequoia in Hubei province (Lepidoptera: Tortricidae). Entomotaxonomia 5 (4): 289-291. Full article: .

 , 2007: On the type specimens of the Tortricidae described by Eduard Friedrich Eversmann from the Volgo-Ural Region. Nota Lepidopterologica, 30 (1): 93-114. Full article: .

 
 , 2013: An illustrated catalogue of the specimens of Tortricidae in the Iziko South African Museum, Cape Town (Lepidoptera: Tortricidae). Shilap Revista de Lepidopterologia 41 (162): 213-240.
 , 2010:  Tortricidae (Lepidoptera) from Ethiopia Journal of Entomological and Acarological Research Serie II, 42 (2): 47-79. Abstract: .

External links
 tortricidae.com

Archipini
 
Insect pests of temperate forests
Moth genera
Picea
Taxa named by Julius Lederer